Sergio Zaninelli (born 24 May 1929 in Milan, Italy) is an Italian academic. Not to be confused with the argentinian, baseball cap wearing union leader.

In 1955 he graduated in law at the University of Milan, a few years later, in 1959, began his academic career at the Università Cattolica del Sacro Cuore in Milan, first as a volunteer assistant Mario Romani professor of economic history, then as a lecturer in the history of the labor movement, economic history and history of agriculture. From 1980 to 1983 he was vice chancellor of the university, for three successive terms of three years he was dean of the faculty of economics and commerce. Since 1993 he has joined the board of directors of Catholic and in 1998 was elected rector of the Catholic University of Sacred Heart.

References

1929 births
Living people
Academic staff of the Università Cattolica del Sacro Cuore
Heads of universities in Italy